Rumah adat are traditional houses built in any of the vernacular architecture styles of Indonesia, collectively belonging to the Austronesian architecture. The traditional houses and settlements of the several hundreds ethnic groups of Indonesia are extremely varied and all have their own specific history. It is the Indonesian variants of the whole Austronesian architecture found all over places where Austronesian people inhabited from the Pacific to Madagascar each having their own history, culture and style.

Ethnic groups in Indonesia are often associated with their own distinctive form of rumah adat. The houses are at the centre of a web of customs, social relations, traditional laws, taboos, myths and religions that bind the villagers together. The house provides the main focus for the family and its community, and is the point of departure for many activities of its residents. Villagers build their own homes, or a community pools its resources for a structure built under the direction of a master builder or carpenter.

The vast majority of Indonesians no longer live in rumah adat, and the numbers have declined rapidly due to economic, technological, and social changes.

General form

With few exceptions, the peoples of the Indonesian archipelago share a common Austronesian ancestry (originating in Taiwan, c. 6,000 years ago) or Sundaland , a sunken area in South East Asia, and traditional homes of Indonesia share a number of characteristics such as timber construction, varied and elaborate roof structures. The earliest Austronesian structures were communal longhouses on stilts, with steep sloping roofs and heavy gables, as seen in the Batak rumah adat and the Torajan Tongkonan. Variations on the communal longhouse principle are found among the Dayak people of Borneo, as well as the Mentawai people.

The norm is for a post, beam and lintel structural system that take load straight to the ground with either wooden or bamboo walls that are non-load bearing. Traditionally, rather than nails, mortis and tenon joints and wooden pegs are used. Natural materials - timber, bamboo, thatch and fibre - make up rumah adat. Hardwood is generally used for piles and a combination of soft and hard wood is used for the house's upper non-load bearing walls, and are often made of lighter wood or thatch. The thatch material can be coconut and sugar palm leaves, alang alang grass and rice straw.

Traditional dwellings have developed to respond to natural environmental conditions, particularly Indonesia's hot and wet monsoon climate. As is common throughout South East Asia and the South West Pacific, most rumah adat are built on stilts, with the exception of Java, Bali, and other houses of Eastern Indonesia. Building houses off the ground on stilts serve a number of purposes: it allows breezes to moderate the hot tropical temperatures; it elevates the dwelling above stormwater runoff and mud; it allows houses to be built on rivers and wetland margins; it keeps people, goods and food from dampness and moisture; lifts living quarters above malaria-carrying mosquitos; and reduces the risk of dry rot and termites. The sharply inclined roof allows the heavy tropical rain to quickly sheet off, and large overhanging eaves keep water out of the house and provide shade in the heat. In hot and humid low-lying coastal regions, homes can have many windows providing good cross-ventilation, whereas in cooler mountainous interior areas, homes often have a vast roof and few windows.

Examples
Examples of rumah adat include:
Batak architecture (North Sumatra) includes the boat-shaped jabu homes of the Toba Batak people, with dominating carved gables and dramatic oversized roof, and are based on an ancient model.
The Minangkabau of West Sumatra build the rumah gadang, distinctive for their multiple gables with dramatically upsweeping ridge ends.
The homes of Nias peoples include the omo sebua chiefs' houses built on massive ironwood pillars with towering roofs. Not only are they almost impregnable to attack in former tribal warfare, but flexible nail-less construction provide proven earthquake durability.
Rumah Melayu Malay traditional houses built on stilts of Sumatra, Borneo and Malay Peninsula.
The Riau region is characterised by villages built on stilts over waterways.
Sundanese imah usually take basic form of gabled roof called kampung style roof, made of thatched materials (ijuk black aren fibers or hateup leaves) with weaved bamboo wall and structure built on short stilts. The more elaborate overhanging gabled roof is called Julang Ngapak.
Unlike most South East Asian vernacular homes, Javanese omah are not built on piles, and have become the Indonesian vernacular style most influenced by European architectural elements.
The Bubungan Tinggi, with their steeply pitched roofs, are the large homes of Banjarese royalty and aristocrats in South Kalimantan.
Traditional Balinese homes are a collection of individual, largely open structures (including separate structures for the kitchen, sleeping areas, bathing areas and shrine) within a high-walled garden compound.
The Sasak people of Lombok build lumbung, pile-built bonnet-roofed rice barns, that are often more distinctive and elaborate than their houses (see Sasak architecture).
Dayak people traditionally live in communal longhouses that are built on piles. The houses can exceed 300 m in length, in some cases forming a whole village.
The Toraja of the Sulawesi highlands are renowned for their tongkonan, houses built on piles and dwarfed by massive exaggerated-pitch saddle roofs.
Rumah adat on Sumba have distinctive thatched "high hat" roofs and are wrapped with sheltered verandahs.
The Papuan Dani traditionally live in small family compounds composed of several circular huts known as honay with thatched dome roofs.

Decline
The numbers of rumah adat are decreasing across Indonesia. This trend dates from the colonial period, with the Dutch generally viewing traditional architecture as unhygienic, with big roofs that sheltered rats. Multi-family homes were viewed with suspicion by religious authorities, as were those aspects of the rumah adat linked to traditional belief.  In parts of the Indies, colonial authorities embarked on vigorous demolition programmes, replacing traditional homes with houses built using Western construction techniques, such as bricks and corrugated iron roofs, fitting sanitary facilities and better ventilation. Traditional craftsmen were retrained in Western building techniques. Since independence, the Indonesian government has continued to promote the 'rumah sehat sederhana' ('simple healthy home') over the rumah adat.

Exposure to the market economy made the construction of labour-intensive rumah adat, such as the Batak house, extremely expensive (previously villages would work together to construct new homes) to build and maintain. In addition, deforestation and population growth meant that the hardwoods were no longer a free resource to be gathered as needed from nearby forests, but instead a too-expensive commodity. Combined with a general appetite for modernity, the great majority of Indonesians now dwell in generic modern buildings rather than traditional rumah adat.

In areas with many tourists, such as the Tanah Toraja, rumah adat are preserved as a spectacle for tourists, their former residents living elsewhere, with design elements exaggerated to the point that these rumah adat are considerably less comfortable than the original designs. While in most areas rumah adat have been abandoned, in a few remote areas they are still current, and in other areas buildings in the style of the rumah adat are maintained for ceremonial purposes, as museums or for official buildings.

Contemporary adaptation

During the colonial Dutch East Indies period around the first half of the 20th century, the typical style and elements of vernacular Indonesian rumah adat were often used as the inspiration, recreated and replicated intentionally to represent the cultural diversity of the colony, also intended to create a festive atmosphere with fantastic architecture. The annual Pasar Gambir for example — a fair held between 1906 and 1942 in Batavia, was known to have gates, stages, towers and pavilions constructed in rumah adat style drawn from all over the archipelago. Each year, these uniquely designed rumah adat pavilions were created and constructed anew using locally available materials, thus also become the attraction of the fair.

This period also saw the pride and desire to showcase the cultural diversity of the colony through showcasing the vernacular architecture of the archipelago. In 1931, during Paris Colonial Exposition, the Netherlands presented a beautiful cultural synthesis from their colony — the Dutch East Indies. The Dutch colonial pavilion was located on exhibition lot as wide as 3 hectares and was built based on the combination of many cultural elements of the Nusantara (Indonesian archipelago), a combination of Indonesian vernacular architecture. It has walls consisted of 750,000 pieces of ironwood from Kalimantan (Indonesian Borneo). As the centerpiece, the front part is decorated with twin 50 metres-tall Balinese Meru towers. The pavilion's roof was done in tumpang or tajug style, a signature of Javanese mosque, completed with carved wooden door of kori agung typical towering portal of pura Balinese temple, combined with arched roof of Minangkabau's atap bagonjong typical of rumah gadang. This fusion of Indonesian vernacular architecture presented a splendid and majestic palace-like pavilion. However, on 28 June 1931, an enormous fire burnt down the Dutch pavilion, along with all cultural objects displayed inside.

Buildings are sometimes built with modern construction techniques that include stylistic elements from rumah adat, such as The House of the Five Senses in the Efteling, a building modeled on the Minangkabau rumah gadang. In the colonial period some Europeans constructed homes according to hybrid Western-adat designs, such as Bendegom, who built a 'transitional' Western-Batak Karo house.

In numbers of places, elements or ornaments of rumah adat  has become the regional identity of provinces or regencies (kabupaten). Thus the construction of government and public buildings are encouraged to include or feature this native architectural elements. Despite technically the new buildings are constructed in contemporary technique with concrete frames and brick walls, instead of traditional timber carpentry. Most often the result is the implant of traditional roof sit on top of modern buildings. This tendency can be seen in West Sumatra and Tana Toraja, where the typical Minang bagonjong (horned) roof and Toraja tongkonan roof are implanted in almost any public buildings; from airports to hotels, restaurants and government offices.

It has been noted that the traditional wooden houses are generally more earthquake-resistant than modern brick designs, although they are more vulnerable to fire. The construction of modern concrete framed and brick walled rumah adat has undermine the very characteristic of traditional wooden house, which is its flexibility to absorb shock-waves generated by an earthquake. These concrete rumah adat-style building often can not withstand earthquake and collapsed, like those buildings collapsed in 2009 Padang earthquake. In some areas, a 'semi-modern' rumah adat concept has been adopted, such as among some Ngada people, with traditional elements placed inside a concrete shell.

See also

 Architecture of Indonesia
 Javanese traditional house
 Balinese traditional house
 Rumah gadang
 Malay houses
 Bahay kubo
 Bahay na Bato
 Torogan

Notes

Bibliography
 Reimar Schefold, P. Nas, Gaudenz Domenig, Indonesian Houses: Tradition and Transformation in Vernacular Architecture, 2004, National University of Singapore Press, Singapore, 
 Dawson, B., Gillow, J., The Traditional Architecture of Indonesia, 1994 Thames and Hudson Ltd, London, 
 Schoppert, P., Damais, S., Java Style, 1997, Didier Millet, Paris, 207 pages, 
 Wijaya, M., Architecture of Bali: A source book of traditional and modern forms, 2002 Archipelago Press, Singapore, 224 pages, 
 Peter JM. Nas, The House in Indonesia

 
Architecture in Indonesia